"Nobody" is a song by Welsh reggae metal band Skindred. The song was released as the first single from the band's debut album Babylon. "Nobody" peaked at number 14 on the Billboard Mainstream Rock Tracks chart and number 23 on its Modern Rock Tracks chart in 2004.

Background
"Nobody" was one of the first Skindred songs written after the dissolution of Dub War, with bassist Daniel Pugsley coming up with the song's main idea. In an interview with Metal Hammer, vocalist Benji Webbe recalled:

The song's inclusion on Babylon was a point of contention between Webbe and producer Howard Benson, with Benson wanting to delete the song entirely after a recording session.

Music video
The music video shows the band playing with a crowd around them. The people in the crowd are dancing in different styles. As the song goes on the crowd gets closer and closer to the band until there is a moshpit while the band plays in the pit.

Legacy
The song saw a resurgence in popularity in early 2023 when it became part of a dance trend on TikTok. Benji Webbe tried the dance, saying "that shit ain't easy."

Track listing

In popular culture
The song was featured on the soundtrack for Need for Speed: Underground 2

Personnel
Skindred
 Benji Webbe – vocals
 Daniel Pugsley – bass
 Mikey Demus – guitar
 Jeff Rose – guitar
 Martyn Ford – drums

Additional
Brandon Abeln — assistant
Howard Benson — keyboards, producer
Aaron Bieler — A&R
Jason Bieler — producer, mixing, A&R
Christina Dittmar — art direction
Martyn Ford — digital editing
Mike Fuller — mastering
Gersh — drum technician
Andrew Goldman — engineer, mixing
David Holdrege — pro-tools
Ted Jensen — mastering
Andrew Karp — A&R
Per Kviman — A&R
Jason Lader — digital editing
Eric Miller — engineer, digital editing
Martie Muhoberac — production coordination
Keith Nelson — guitar technician
Johnny O. — digital editing
Mark Obriski — design
Mike Plotnikoff — engineer, digital editing
F. Scott Schafer — photography
Rick "Soldier" Will — mixing

Charts

References

2002 singles
2004 singles
Skindred songs
2002 songs
Song recordings produced by Howard Benson